Sweden held a general election on 15 September 1940.

Results

Regional results
Due to the Socialist Party losing its Riksdag representation, only the Social Democrats and the Communist Party have been counted towards the leftist bloc.

Percentage share

By votes

Constituency results

Percentage share

By votes

Results by city and district

Blekinge

Gothenburg and Bohuslän

Bohuslän

Gothenburg

Gotland

Gävleborg

Halland

Jämtland

Jönköping

Kalmar

Kopparberg

Kristianstad

Kronoberg

Malmöhus

Malmö area

Malmöhus County

Norrbotten

Skaraborg

Stockholm

Stockholm (city)

Stockholm County

Södermanland

Uppsala

Värmland

Västerbotten

Västernorrland

Västmanland

Älvsborg

Älvsborg N

Älvsborg S

Örebro

Östergötland

References

General elections in Sweden